Sukkul-Mikhaylovka (Hıwıqqul-Mixaylovka) is a rural locality (a village) in Novokarmalinsky Selsoviet, Miyakinsky District, Bashkortostan, Russia. The population was 313 as of 2010. There are 3 streets.

Geography 
Sukkul-Mikhaylovka is located 8 km northwest of Kirgiz-Miyaki (the district's administrative centre) by road. Kyzyl-Chishma is the nearest rural locality.

References 

Rural localities in Miyakinsky District